This is a list of the bird species recorded in the Gambia. The avifauna of the Gambia include a total of 619 species, two of which have been introduced. The country, which is very small and almost completely surrounded by Senegal, has no endemic species.

This list's taxonomic treatment (designation and sequence of orders, families and species) and nomenclature (English and scientific names) are those of The Clements Checklist of Birds of the World, 2022 edition.

The following tags have been used to highlight several categories. Not all species will fall into one of these categories. Those that do not are commonly occurring native species.

(A) Accidental - a species that rarely or accidentally occurs in the Gambia
(I) Introduced - a species introduced to the Gambia as a consequence, direct or indirect, of human actions
(Ex) Extirpated - a species that no longer occurs in the Gambia although populations exist elsewhere

Ducks, geese, and waterfowl

Order: AnseriformesFamily: Anatidae

Anatidae includes the ducks and most duck-like waterfowl, such as geese and swans. These birds are adapted to an aquatic existence with webbed feet, flattened bills, and feathers that are excellent at shedding water due to an oily coating.

 White-faced whistling-duck, Dendrocygna viduata
 Fulvous whistling-duck, Dendrocygna bicolor
 White-backed duck, Thalassornis leuconotus
 Knob-billed duck, Sarkidiornis melanotos
 Egyptian goose, Alopochen aegyptiacus
 Spur-winged goose, Plectropterus gambensis
 African pygmy-goose, Nettapus auritus
 Garganey, Spatula querquedula
 Northern shoveler, Spatula clypeata
 Gadwall, Mareca strepera (A)
 Eurasian wigeon, Mareca penelope (A)
 American wigeon, Mareca americana (A)
 Northern pintail, Anas acuta
 Green-winged teal, Anas crecca
 Common pochard, Aythya ferina (A)
 Ferruginous duck, Aythya nyroca
 Tufted duck, Aythya fuligula

Guineafowl
Order: GalliformesFamily: Numididae

Guineafowl are a group of African, seed-eating, ground-nesting birds that resemble partridges, but with featherless heads and spangled grey plumage.

 Helmeted guineafowl, Numida meleagris

New World quail
Order: GalliformesFamily: Odontophoridae

Despite their family's common name, this species and one other are native to Africa.

 Stone partridge, Ptilopachus petrosus

Pheasants, grouse, and allies
Order: GalliformesFamily: Phasianidae

The Phasianidae are a family of terrestrial birds which consists of quails, snowcocks, francolins, spurfowls, tragopans, monals, pheasants, peafowls, and jungle fowls. In general, they are plump (although they vary in size) and have broad, relatively short wings.

 White-throated francolin, Campocolinus albogularis
 Common quail, Coturnix coturnix
 Ahanta francolin, Pternistis ahantensis
 Double-spurred francolin, Pternistis bicalcaratus

Flamingos
Order: PhoenicopteriformesFamily: Phoenicopteridae

Flamingos filter-feed on shellfish and algae. Their oddly shaped beaks are specially adapted to separate mud and silt from the food they consume and, uniquely, are used upside-down.

 Greater flamingo, Phoenicopterus roseus
 Lesser flamingo, Phoenicopterus minor

Grebes

Order: PodicipediformesFamily: Podicipedidae

Grebes are small to medium-sized diving birds. They breed on fresh water, but often visit the sea whilst migrating and in winter. They have lobed toes and are excellent swimmers and divers; however, their feet are placed far back on their bodies, making them quite ungainly on land.

 Little grebe, Tachybaptus ruficollis
 Eared grebe, Podiceps nigricollis (A)

Pigeons and doves

Order: ColumbiformesFamily: Columbidae

Pigeons and doves are stout-bodied birds with short necks and short slender bills with a fleshy cere.

 Rock pigeon, Columba livia
 Speckled pigeon, Columba guinea
 European turtle-dove, Streptopelia turtur
 Adamawa turtle-dove, Streptopelia hypopyrrha (A)
 African collared-dove, Streptopelia roseogrisea
 Mourning collared-dove, Streptopelia decipiens
 Red-eyed dove, Streptopelia semitorquata
 Vinaceous dove, Streptopelia vinacea
 Laughing dove, Streptopelia senegalensis
 Black-billed wood-dove, Turtur abyssinicus
 Blue-spotted wood-dove, Turtur afer
 Tambourine dove, Turtur tympanistria
 Namaqua dove, Oena capensis
 Bruce's green-pigeon, Treron waalia
 African green-pigeon, Treron calva

Sandgrouse
Order: PterocliformesFamily: Pteroclidae

Sandgrouse have small pigeon-like heads and necks, but sturdy compact bodies. They have long pointed wings and sometimes tails and a fast direct flight. Flocks fly to watering holes at dawn and dusk. Their legs are feathered down to the toes.

 Chestnut-bellied sandgrouse, Pterocles exustus(A)
 Four-banded sandgrouse, Pterocles quadricinctus

Bustards
Order: OtidiformesFamily: Otidae

Bustards are large terrestrial birds mainly associated with dry open country and steppes in the Old World. They are omnivorous and nest on the ground. They walk steadily on strong legs and big toes, pecking for food as they go. They have long broad wings with "fingered" wingtips and striking patterns in flight. Many have interesting mating displays.

 Arabian bustard, Ardeotis arabs(A)
 Denham's bustard, Neotis denhami
 White-bellied bustard, Eupodotis senegalensis(A)
 Savile's bustard, Lophotis savilei
 Black-bellied bustard, Lissotis melanogaster

Turacos
Order: MusophagiformesFamily: Musophagidae

The turacos, plantain-eaters, and go-away-birds make up the family Musophagidae. They are medium-sized arboreal birds. The turacos and plantain-eaters are brightly coloured, usually in blue, green, or purple. The go-away-birds are mostly grey and white.

 Guinea turaco, Tauraco persa
 Violet turaco, Musophaga violacea
 Western plantain-eater, Crinifer piscator

Cuckoos

Order: CuculiformesFamily: Cuculidae

The family Cuculidae includes cuckoos, roadrunners, and anis. These birds are of variable size with slender bodies, long tails, and strong legs. The Old World cuckoos are brood parasites.

 Senegal coucal, Centropus senegalensis
 Black coucal, Centropus grillii
 Blue malkoha, Ceuthmochares aereus
 Great spotted cuckoo, Clamator glandarius
 Levaillant's cuckoo, Clamator levaillantii
 Pied cuckoo, Clamator jacobinus
 Dideric cuckoo, Chrysococcyx caprius
 Klaas's cuckoo, Chrysococcyx klaas
 African emerald cuckoo, Chrysococcyx cupreus(A)
 Black cuckoo, Cuculus clamosus(A)
 Red-chested cuckoo, Cuculus solitarius
 African cuckoo, Cuculus gularis
 Common cuckoo, Cuculus canorus

Nightjars and allies

Order: CaprimulgiformesFamily: Caprimulgidae

Nightjars are medium-sized nocturnal birds that usually nest on the ground. They have long wings, short legs, and very short bills. Most have small feet, of little use for walking, and long pointed wings. Their soft plumage is camouflaged to resemble bark or leaves.

 Pennant-winged nightjar, Caprimulgus vexillarius(A)
 Standard-winged nightjar, Caprimulgus longipennis
 Red-necked nightjar, Caprimulgus ruficollis
 Eurasian nightjar, Caprimulgus europaeus
 Egyptian nightjar, Caprimulgus aegyptius
 Fiery-necked nightjar, Caprimulgus pectoralis
 Swamp nightjar, Caprimulgus natalensis(A)
 Plain nightjar, Caprimulgus inornatus
 Long-tailed nightjar, Caprimulgus climacurus

Swifts

Order: CaprimulgiformesFamily: Apodidae

Swifts are small birds which spend the majority of their lives flying. These birds have very short legs and never settle voluntarily on the ground, perching instead only on vertical surfaces. Many swifts have long swept-back wings which resemble a crescent or boomerang.

 Mottled spinetail, Telacanthura ussheri
 Alpine swift, Apus melba (A)
 Common swift, Apus apus
 Pallid swift, Apus pallidus
 Little swift, Apus affinis
 White-rumped swift, Apus caffer (A)
 African palm-swift, Cypsiurus parvus

Flufftails
Order: GruiformesFamily: Sarothruridae

The flufftails are a small family of ground-dwelling birds found only in Madagascar and sub-Saharan Africa.

 White-spotted flufftail, Sarothrura pulchra

Rails, gallinules, and coots
Order: GruiformesFamily: Rallidae

Rallidae is a large family of small to medium-sized birds which includes the rails, crakes, coots, and gallinules. Typically they inhabit dense vegetation in damp environments near lakes, swamps, or rivers. In general they are shy and secretive birds, making them difficult to observe. Most species have strong legs and long toes which are well adapted to soft uneven surfaces. They tend to have short, rounded wings and to be weak fliers.

 African rail, Rallus caerulescens(A)
 African crake, Crex egregia
 Spotted crake, Porzana porzana (A)
 Lesser moorhen, Paragallinula angulata
 Eurasian moorhen, Gallinula chloropus
 Eurasian coot, Fulica atra(A)
 Allen's gallinule, Porphyrio alleni
 African swamphen, Porphyrio madagascariensis
 Black crake, Zapornia flavirostris
 Little crake, Zapornia parva(A)
 Baillon's crake, Zapornia pusilla (A)

Finfoots
Order: GruiformesFamily: Heliornithidae

Heliornithidae is a small family of tropical birds with webbed lobes on their feet similar to those of grebes and coots.

 African finfoot, Podica senegalensis

Cranes

Order: GruiformesFamily: Gruidae

Cranes are large, long-legged, and long-necked birds. Unlike the similar-looking but unrelated herons, cranes fly with necks outstretched, not pulled back. Most have elaborate and noisy courting displays or "dances".

 Black crowned crane, Balearica pavonina

Thick-knees
Order: CharadriiformesFamily: Burhinidae

The thick-knees are a group of waders found worldwide within the tropical zone, with some species also breeding in temperate Europe and Australia. They are medium to large waders with strong black or yellow-black bills, large yellow eyes, and cryptic plumage. Despite being classed as waders, most species have a preference for arid or semi-arid habitats.

 Eurasian thick-knee, Burhinus oedicnemus (A)
 Senegal thick-knee, Burhinus senegalensis
 Spotted thick-knee, Burhinus capensis

Egyptian plover
Order: CharadriiformesFamily: Pluvianidae

The Egyptian plover is found across equatorial Africa and along the Nile River.

Egyptian plover, Pluvianus aegyptius

Stilts and avocets
Order: CharadriiformesFamily: Recurvirostridae

Recurvirostridae is a family of large wading birds which includes the avocets and stilts. The avocets have long legs and long up-curved bills. The stilts have extremely long legs and long, thin, straight bills.

 Black-winged stilt, Himantopus himantopus
 Pied avocet, Recurvirostra avosetta

Oystercatchers
Order: CharadriiformesFamily: Haematopodidae

The oystercatchers are large and noisy plover-like birds with strong bills used for smashing or prising open molluscs.

 Eurasian oystercatcher, Haematopus ostralegus
 African oystercatcher, Haematopus moquini (A)

Plovers and lapwings

Order: CharadriiformesFamily: Charadriidae

Lapwings, plovers and dotterels are small to medium-sized birds with compact bodies, short, thick necks and long, usually pointed, wings. They are found in open country worldwide, generally in habitats near water, although there are some exceptions.

 Black-bellied plover, Pluvialis squatarola
 European golden-plover, Pluvialis apricaria (A)
 American golden-plover, Pluvialis dominica(A)
 Northern lapwing, Vanellus vanellus(A)
 Spur-winged lapwing, Vanellus spinosus
 Black-headed lapwing, Vanellus tectus
 White-headed lapwing, Vanellus albiceps
 Senegal lapwing, Vanellus lugubris(A)
 Wattled lapwing, Vanellus senegallus
 Caspian plover, Charadrius asiaticus(A)
 Kittlitz's plover, Charadrius pecuarius
 Kentish plover, Charadrius alexandrinus
 Common ringed plover, Charadrius hiaticula
 Little ringed plover, Charadrius dubius
 Forbes's plover, Charadrius forbesi(A)
 White-fronted plover, Charadrius marginatus
 Eurasian dotterel, Charadrius morinellus(A)

Painted-snipes

Order: CharadriiformesFamily: Rostratulidae

Painted-snipes are short-legged, long-billed birds similar in shape to the true snipes, but more brightly coloured.

 Greater painted-snipe, Rostratula benghalensis

Jacanas
Order: CharadriiformesFamily: Jacanidae

The jacanas are a group of waders found throughout the tropics. They are identifiable by their huge feet and claws which enable them to walk on floating vegetation in the shallow lakes that are their preferred habitat.

 African jacana, Actophilornis africanus

Sandpipers and allies

Order: CharadriiformesFamily: Scolopacidae

 Whimbrel, Numenius phaeopus
 Eurasian curlew, Numenius arquata
 Bar-tailed godwit, Limosa lapponica
 Black-tailed godwit, Limosa limosa
 Ruddy turnstone, Arenaria interpres
 Red knot, Calidris canutus
 Ruff, Calidris pugnax
 Curlew sandpiper, Calidris ferruginea
 Temminck's stint, Calidris temminckii
 Sanderling, Calidris alba
 Dunlin, Calidris alpina
 Purple sandpiper, Calidris maritima
 Baird's sandpiper, Calidris bairdii (A)
 Little stint, Calidris minuta
 Long-billed dowitcher, Limnodromus scolopaceus (A)
 Jack snipe, Lymnocryptes minimus
 Great snipe, Gallinago media (A)
 Common snipe, Gallinago gallinago
 Terek sandpiper, Xenus cinereus (A)
 Red-necked phalarope, Phalaropus lobatus (A)
 Red phalarope, Phalaropus fulicarius
 Common sandpiper, Actitis hypoleucos
 Green sandpiper, Tringa ochropus
 Solitary sandpiper, Tringa solitaria (A)
 Spotted redshank, Tringa erythropus
 Common greenshank, Tringa nebularia
 Lesser yellowlegs, Tringa flavipes (A)
 Marsh sandpiper, Tringa stagnatilis
 Wood sandpiper, Tringa glareola
 Common redshank, Tringa totanus

Buttonquail
Order: CharadriiformesFamily: Turnicidae

The buttonquail are small, drab, running birds which resemble the true quails. The female is the brighter of the sexes and initiates courtship. The male incubates the eggs and tends the young.

 Small buttonquail, Turnix sylvaticus
 Quail-plover, Ortyxelos meiffrenii (A)

Pratincoles and coursers
Order: CharadriiformesFamily: Glareolidae

Glareolidae is a family of wading birds comprising the pratincoles, which have short legs, long pointed wings, and long forked tails, and the coursers, which have long legs, short wings, and long, pointed bills which curve downwards.

 Cream-coloured courser, Cursorius cursor(A)
 Temminck's courser, Cursorius temminckii
 Bronze-winged courser, Rhinoptilus chalcopterus
 Collared pratincole, Glareola pratincola

Skuas and jaegers
Order: CharadriiformesFamily: Stercorariidae

The family Stercorariidae are, in general, medium to large birds, typically with grey or brown plumage, often with white markings on the wings. They nest on the ground in temperate and arctic regions and are long-distance migrants.

 Great skua, Stercorarius skua (A)
 Pomarine jaeger, Stercorarius pomarinus
 Parasitic jaeger, Stercorarius parasiticus

Gulls, terns, and skimmers

Order: CharadriiformesFamily: Laridae

 Black-legged kittiwake, Rissa tridactyla (A)
 Sabine's gull, Xema sabini (A)
 Slender-billed gull, Chroicocephalus genei
 Gray-hooded gull, Chroicocephalus cirrocephalus
 Black-headed gull, Chroicocephalus ridibundus
 Little gull, Hydrocoloeus minutus (A)
 Laughing gull, Leucophaeus atricilla (A)
 Franklin's gull, Leucophaeus pipixcan (A)
 Mediterranean gull, Ichthyaetus melanocephalus (A)
 Audouin's gull, Ichthyaetus audouinii 
 Common gull, Larus canus(A)
 Ring-billed gull, Larus delawarensis(A)
 Herring gull, Larus argentatus (A)
 Yellow-legged gull, Larus michahellis (A)
 Lesser black-backed gull, Larus fuscus
 Kelp gull, Larus dominicanus
 Brown noddy, Anous stolidus(A)
 Black noddy, Anous minutus(A)
 Bridled tern, Onychoprion anaethetus(A)
 Little tern, Sternula albifrons
 Gull-billed tern, Gelochelidon nilotica
 Caspian tern, Hydroprogne caspia
 Black tern, Chlidonias niger
 White-winged tern, Chlidonias leucopterus
 Whiskered tern, Chlidonias hybrida
 Roseate tern, Sterna dougallii(A)
 Common tern, Sterna hirundo
 Arctic tern, Sterna paradisaea
 Sandwich tern, Thalasseus sandvicensis
 Lesser crested tern, Thalasseus bengalensis
 West African crested tern, Thalasseus albididorsalis
 African skimmer, Rynchops flavirostris

Tropicbirds

Order: PhaethontiformesFamily: Phaethontidae

Tropicbirds are slender white birds of tropical oceans, with exceptionally long central tail feathers. Their heads and long wings have black markings.

 Red-billed tropicbird, Phaethon aethereus

Southern storm-petrels

Order: ProcellariiformesFamily: Oceanitidae

The southern storm-petrels are relatives of the petrels and are the smallest seabirds. They feed on planktonic crustaceans and small fish picked from the surface, typically while hovering. The flight is fluttering and sometimes bat-like.

 Wilson's storm-petrel, Oceanites oceanicus

Northern storm-petrels
Order: ProcellariiformesFamily: Hydrobatidae

Though the members of this family are similar in many respects to the southern storm-petrels, including their general appearance and habits, there are enough genetic differences to warrant their placement in a separate family.

 European storm-petrel, Hydrobates pelagicus
 Leach's storm-petrel, Hydrobates leucorhous(A)

Shearwaters and petrels
Order: ProcellariiformesFamily: Procellariidae

Shearwaters are medium-sized, long-winged seabirds. Highly pelagic, they come ashore only to breed, nesting on islands and rocky cliffs. They generally glide low above the water on stiff wings, and feed on fish, squid and similar oceanic food. There are 23–27 species worldwide. (Some experts split Audubon's shearwater into several distinct species, while others consider those distinctive forms to be subspecies.)

 Fea's petrel, Pterodroma feae
 Cory's shearwater, Calonectris diomedea
 Great shearwater, Ardenna gravis (A)
 Sooty shearwater, Ardenna grisea (A)
 Manx shearwater, Puffinus puffinus(A)
 Balearic shearwater, Puffinus mauretanicus
 Boyd's shearwater, Puffinus boydi

Storks

Order: CiconiiformesFamily: Ciconiidae

Storks are large, long-legged, long-necked wading birds with long stout bills. They occur in most of the world's warmer regions and tend to live in drier habitats than herons, to which they're closely related. They build large stick nests and sometimes nest colonially. Many species are migratory. Most storks eat a variety of small vertebrates and invertebrates; some eat carrion. Seven species have been recorded in the Gambia.

 Black stork, Ciconia nigra(A)
 Abdim's stork, Ciconia abdimii(A)
 African woolly-necked stork, Ciconia microscelis
 White stork, Ciconia ciconia(A)
 Saddle-billed stork, Ephippiorhynchus senegalensis
 Marabou stork, Leptoptilos crumenifer
 Yellow-billed stork, Mycteria ibis

Frigatebirds
Order: SuliformesFamily: Fregatidae

Frigatebirds are large seabirds typically found soaring over tropical oceans. They have long wings and a deeply forked tail; their plumage is either black (males) or black-and-white (females and young). Males have coloured inflatable throat pouches, which are used in courtship. Frigatebirds spend most of their time in the air. They are kleptoparasites and often chase other seabirds to get them to drop their catches of fish; they also scoop fish from the water's surface.

 Magnificent frigatebird, Fregata magnificens(A)

Gannets and boobies

Order: SuliformesFamily: Sulidae

Gannets and boobies are large seabirds with long beaks and long, pointed wings. They eat fish, which they hunt by plunge-diving from heights of up to 30 m and chasing their prey underwater. They nest colonially on islands and along coasts, either on the ground or in trees.

 Brown booby, Sula leucogaster(A)
 Northern gannet, Morus bassanus

Anhingas

Order: SuliformesFamily: Anhingidae

Anhingas or darters are large waterbirds, found primarily in fresh and brackish water habitats. Because their plumage is not entirely waterproof, they often stand out of the water with their wings outstretched, drying off. Darters are strongly sexually dimorphic; males generally have much darker plumage than do females. They eat primarily fish, which they catch by diving from the water's surface.

 African darter, Anhinga rufa

Cormorants and shags
Order: SuliformesFamily: Phalacrocoracidae

Cormorants are medium to large seabirds, found primarily along the coast, but occasionally ranging some way inland in aquatic environments. Their plumage is generally dark, though most species have areas of brightly coloured skin on the face. They are primarily fish eaters. Their bills are long, thin and sharply hooked, and their four-toed feet are webbed. Because their plumage is only semi-waterproof, they often stand out of the water with their wings outstretched to dry out their feathers.

 Long-tailed cormorant, Microcarbo africanus
 Great cormorant, Phalacrocorax carbo

Pelicans
Order: PelecaniformesFamily: Pelecanidae

Pelicans are large water birds with a distinctive pouch under their beak. As with other members of the order Pelecaniformes, they have webbed feet with four toes.

 Great white pelican, Pelecanus onocrotalus
 Pink-backed pelican, Pelecanus rufescens

Hamerkop

Order: PelecaniformesFamily: Scopidae

Hamerkops are medium-sized, all-brown wading birds named for their hammer-headed appearance, which is created by the combination of their shaggy backwards-pointing crests and their heavy black bills. Typically found in wetland areas, they forage in shallow water for amphibians, small fish, crustaceans, insects, worms and small mammals. They build enormous, complex nests—which they generally use for only a matter of months—and occupy their territories year-round.

 Hamerkop, Scopus umbretta

Herons, egrets, and bitterns

Order: PelecaniformesFamily: Ardeidae

Herons, egrets and bitterns are long-legged birds typically associated with wetlands; herons and egrets are long-necked, while bitterns tend to be shorter-necked and quite secretive. Birds in this family often wade in shallow waters, preying on various aquatic organisms (including fish and frogs) as well as reptiles, amphibians and the occasional small bird. In flight, they hold their neck retracted in a gentle S-curve.

 Great bittern, Botaurus stellaris (A)
 Little bittern, Ixobrychus minutus
 Dwarf bittern, Ixobrychus sturmii
 White-crested bittern, Tigriornis leucolophus
 Gray heron, Ardea cinerea
 Black-headed heron, Ardea melanocephala
 Goliath heron, Ardea goliath
 Purple heron, Ardea purpurea
 Great egret, Ardea alba
 Intermediate egret, Ardea intermedia
 Little egret, Egretta garzetta
 Western reef-heron, Egretta gularis
 Black heron, Egretta ardesiaca
 Cattle egret, Bubulcus ibis
 Squacco heron, Ardeola ralloides
 Striated heron, Butorides striata
 Black-crowned night-heron, Nycticorax nycticorax
 White-backed night-heron, Gorsachius leuconotus

Ibises and spoonbills
Order: PelecaniformesFamily: Threskiornithidae

Threskiornithidae is a family of large terrestrial and wading birds which includes the ibises and spoonbills.

 Glossy ibis, Plegadis falcinellus
 African sacred ibis, Threskiornis aethiopicus
 Hadada ibis, Bostrychia hagedash
 Eurasian spoonbill, Platalea leucorodia
 African spoonbill, Platalea alba

Secretarybird
Order: AccipitriformesFamily: Sagittariidae

The secretarybird is a bird of prey in the order Accipitriformes but is easily distinguished from other raptors by its long crane-like legs.

 Secretarybird, Sagittarius serpentarius(A)

Osprey
Order: AccipitriformesFamily: Pandionidae

 Osprey, Pandion haliaetus

Hawks, eagles, and kites

Order: AccipitriformesFamily: Accipitridae

 Black-winged kite, Elanus caeruleus
 Scissor-tailed kite, Chelictinia riocourii
 African harrier-hawk, Polyboroides typus
 Palm-nut vulture, Gypohierax angolensis
 Egyptian vulture, Neophron percnopterus
 European honey-buzzard, Pernis apivorus
 African cuckoo-hawk, Aviceda cuculoides
 White-headed vulture, Trigonoceps occipitalis
 Cinereous vulture, Aegypius monachus (A)
 Lappet-faced vulture, Torgos tracheliotos
 Hooded vulture, Necrosyrtes monachus
 White-backed vulture, Gyps africanus
 Rüppell's griffon, Gyps rueppelli
 Eurasian griffon, Gyps fulvus
 Bateleur, Terathopius ecaudatus
 Short-toed snake-eagle, Circaetus gallicus
 Beaudouin's snake-eagle, Circaetus beaudouini
 Brown snake-eagle, Circaetus cinereus
 Banded snake-eagle, Circaetus cinerascens
 Bat hawk, Macheiramphus alcinus (A)
 Crowned eagle, Stephanoaetus coronatus (A)
 Martial eagle, Polemaetus bellicosus
 Long-crested eagle, Lophaetus occipitalis
 Wahlberg's eagle, Hieraaetus wahlbergi
 Booted eagle, Hieraaetus pennatus
 Ayres's hawk-eagle, Hieraaetus ayresii (A)
 Tawny eagle, Aquila rapax
 Bonelli's eagle, Aquila fasciata (A)
 African hawk-eagle, Aquila spilogaster
 Lizard buzzard, Kaupifalco monogrammicus
 Dark chanting-goshawk, Melierax metabates
 Gabar goshawk, Micronisus gabar
 Grasshopper buzzard, Butastur rufipennis
 Eurasian marsh-harrier, Circus aeruginosus
 Pallid harrier, Circus macrourus
 Montagu's harrier, Circus pygargus
 African goshawk, Accipiter tachiro
 Shikra, Accipiter badius
 Red-thighed sparrowhawk, Accipiter erythropus
 Ovambo sparrowhawk, Accipiter ovampensis
 Eurasian sparrowhawk, Accipiter nisus(A)
 Black goshawk, Accipiter melanoleucus (A)
 Red kite, Milvus milvus(A)
 Black kite, Milvus migrans
 African fish-eagle, Haliaeetus vocifer
 Common buzzard, Buteo buteo (A)
 Long-legged buzzard, Buteo rufinus(A)
 Red-necked buzzard, Buteo auguralis
 Augur buzzard, Buteo augur

Barn-owls
Order: StrigiformesFamily: Tytonidae

Barn-owls are medium to large owls with large heads and characteristic heart-shaped faces. They have long strong legs with powerful talons.

 Barn owl, Tyto alba

Owls

Order: StrigiformesFamily: Strigidae

The typical owls are small to large solitary nocturnal birds of prey. They have large forward-facing eyes and ears, a hawk-like beak and a conspicuous circle of feathers around each eye called a facial disk.

 Eurasian scops-owl, Otus scops
 African scops-owl, Otus senegalensis
 Northern white-faced owl, Ptilopsis leucotis
 Grayish eagle-owl, Bubo cinerascens
 Verreaux's eagle-owl, Bubo lacteus
 Pel's fishing-owl, Scotopelia peli
 Pearl-spotted owlet, Glaucidium perlatum
 African wood-owl, Strix woodfordii
 Short-eared owl, Asio flammeus (A)
 Marsh owl, Asio capensis

Mousebirds
Order: ColiiformesFamily: Coliidae

The mousebirds are slender grayish or brown birds with soft, hairlike body feathers and very long thin tails. They are arboreal and scurry through the leaves like rodents in search of berries, fruit, and buds. They are acrobatic and can feed upside down. All species have strong claws and reversible outer toes. They also have crests and stubby bills.

 Blue-naped mousebird, Urocolius macrourus (A)

Hoopoes
Order: BucerotiformesFamily: Upupidae

Hoopoes have black, white and orangey-pink colouring with a large erectile crest on their head.

 Eurasian hoopoe, Upupa epops

Woodhoopoes and scimitarbills
Order: BucerotiformesFamily: Phoeniculidae

The woodhoopoes are related to the kingfishers, rollers and hoopoes. They most resemble the hoopoes with their long curved bills, used to probe for insects, and short rounded wings. However, they differ in that they have metallic plumage, often blue, green or purple, and lack an erectile crest.

 Green woodhoopoe, Phoeniculus purpureus
 Black scimitarbill, Rhinopomastus aterrimus

Ground-hornbills
Order: BucerotiformesFamily: Bucorvidae

The ground-hornbills are terrestrial birds which feed almost entirely on insects, other birds, snakes, and amphibians.

 Abyssinian ground-hornbill, Bucorvus abyssinicus

Hornbills
Order: BucerotiformesFamily: Bucerotidae

Hornbills are a group of birds whose bill is shaped like a cow's horn, but without a twist, sometimes with a casque on the upper mandible. Frequently, the bill is brightly coloured.

 African pied hornbill, Lophoceros fasciatus
 African gray hornbill, Lophoceros nasutus
 Western red-billed hornbill, Tockus kempi
 Black-casqued hornbill, Ceratogymna atrata (A)
 Yellow-casqued hornbill, Ceratogymna elata (Ex)
 Piping hornbill, Bycanistes fistulator

Kingfishers

Order: CoraciiformesFamily: Alcedinidae

 Shining blue kingfisher, Alcedo quadribrachys
 Malachite kingfisher, Corythornis cristatus
 African pygmy kingfisher, Ispidina picta
 Gray-headed kingfisher, Halcyon leucocephala
 Woodland kingfisher, Halcyon senegalensis
 Blue-breasted kingfisher, Halcyon malimbica
 Striped kingfisher, Halcyon chelicuti
 Giant kingfisher, Megaceryle maxima
 Pied kingfisher, Ceryle rudis

Bee-eaters

Order: CoraciiformesFamily: Meropidae

The bee-eaters are a group of near passerine birds in the family Meropidae. Most species are found in Africa but others occur in southern Europe, Madagascar, Australia and New Guinea. They are characterised by richly coloured plumage, slender bodies and usually elongated central tail feathers. All are colourful and have long downturned bills and pointed wings, which give them a swallow-like appearance when seen from afar.

 Red-throated bee-eater, Merops bulocki
 Little bee-eater, Merops pusillus
 Swallow-tailed bee-eater, Merops hirundineus
 White-throated bee-eater, Merops albicollis
 Green bee-eater, Merops orientalis
 Blue-cheeked bee-eater, Merops persicus
 European bee-eater, Merops apiaster
 Northern carmine bee-eater, Merops nubicus

Rollers
Order: CoraciiformesFamily: Coraciidae

Rollers resemble crows in size and build, but are more closely related to the kingfishers and bee-eaters. They share the colourful appearance of those groups with blues and browns predominating. The two inner front toes are connected, but the outer toe is not.

 European roller, Coracias garrulus
 Abyssinian roller, Coracias abyssinica
 Rufous-crowned roller, Coracias naevia
 Blue-bellied roller, Coracias cyanogaster
 Broad-billed roller, Eurystomus glaucurus

African barbets
Order: PiciformesFamily: Lybiidae

The African barbets are plump birds, with short necks and large heads. They get their name from the bristles which fringe their heavy bills. Most species are brightly coloured.

 Red-rumped tinkerbird, Pogoniulus atroflavus
 Yellow-rumped tinkerbird, Pogoniulus bilineatus
 Yellow-fronted tinkerbird, Pogoniulus chrysoconus
 Hairy-breasted barbet, Tricholaema hirsuta (A)
 Vieillot's barbet, Lybius vieilloti
 Bearded barbet, Lybius dubius

Honeyguides
Order: PiciformesFamily: Indicatoridae

Honeyguides are among the few birds that feed on wax. They are named for the greater honeyguide which leads traditional honey-hunters to bees' nests and, after the hunters have harvested the honey, feeds on the remaining contents of the hive.

 Cassin's honeyguide, Prodotiscus insignis (A)
 Wahlberg's honeyguide, Prodotiscus regulus (A)
 Least honeyguide, Indicator exilis
 Lesser honeyguide, Indicator minor
 Spotted honeyguide, Indicator maculatus
 Greater honeyguide, Indicator indicator

Woodpeckers

Order: PiciformesFamily: Picidae

Woodpeckers are small to medium-sized birds with chisel-like beaks, short legs, stiff tails and long tongues used for capturing insects. Some species have feet with two toes pointing forward and two backward, while several species have only three toes. Many woodpeckers have the habit of tapping noisily on tree trunks with their beaks.

 Eurasian wryneck, Jynx torquilla
 Little grey woodpecker, Chloropicus elachus
 Cardinal woodpecker, Chloropicus fuscescens
 Brown-backed woodpecker, Chloropicus obsoletus
 African gray woodpecker, Chloropicus goertae
 Buff-spotted woodpecker, Campethera nivosa
 Little green woodpecker, Campethera maculosa (A)
 Fine-spotted woodpecker, Campethera punctuligera
 Golden-tailed woodpecker, Campethera abingoni

Falcons and caracaras
Order: FalconiformesFamily: Falconidae

Falconidae is a family of diurnal birds of prey. They differ from hawks, eagles and kites in that they kill with their beaks instead of their talons.

 Lesser kestrel, Falco naumanni
 Eurasian kestrel, Falco tinnunculus
 Fox kestrel, Falco alopex(A)
 Gray kestrel, Falco ardosiaceus
 Red-necked falcon, Falco chicquera
 Red-footed falcon, Falco vespertinus(A)
 Eurasian hobby, Falco subbuteo
 African hobby, Falco cuvierii
 Lanner falcon, Falco biarmicus
 Peregrine falcon, Falco peregrinus

Old World parrots
Order: PsittaciformesFamily: Psittaculidae

Characteristic features of parrots include a strong curved bill, an upright stance, strong legs, and clawed zygodactyl feet. Many parrots are vividly colored, and some are multi-colored. Old World parrots are found from Africa east across south and southeast Asia and Oceania to Australia and New Zealand.

 Rose-ringed parakeet, Psittacula krameri

African and New World parrots

Order: PsittaciformesFamily: Psittacidae

Parrots are small to large birds with a characteristic curved beak. Their upper mandibles have slight mobility in the joint with the skull and they have a generally erect stance. All parrots are zygodactyl, having the four toes on each foot placed two at the front and two to the back. Most of the more than 150 species in this family are found in the New World.

 Brown-necked parrot, Poicephalus fuscicollis
 Senegal parrot, Poicephalus senegalus

Cuckooshrikes
Order: PasseriformesFamily: Campephagidae

The cuckooshrikes are small to medium-sized passerine birds. They are predominantly greyish with white and black, although some species are brightly coloured.

 White-breasted cuckooshrike, Coracina pectoralis
 Red-shouldered cuckooshrike, Campephaga phoenicea

Old World orioles
Order: PasseriformesFamily: Oriolidae

The Old World orioles are colourful passerine birds. They are not related to the New World orioles.

 Eurasian golden oriole, Oriolus oriolus(A)
 African golden oriole, Oriolus auratus

Wattle-eyes and batises
Order: PasseriformesFamily: Platysteiridae

The wattle-eyes, or puffback flycatchers, are small stout passerine birds of the African tropics. They get their name from the brightly coloured fleshy eye decorations found in most species in this group.

 Brown-throated wattle-eye, Platysteira cyanea
 Senegal batis, Batis senegalensis

Vangas, helmetshrikes, and allies
Order: PasseriformesFamily: Vangidae

The helmetshrikes are similar in build to the shrikes, but tend to be colourful species with distinctive crests or other head ornaments, such as wattles, from which they get their name.

 White helmetshrike, Prionops plumatus
 African shrike-flycatcher, Megabyas flammulatus(A)
 Black-and-white shrike-flycatcher, Bias musicus(A)

Bushshrikes and allies
Order: PasseriformesFamily: Malaconotidae

Bushshrikes are similar in habits to shrikes, hunting insects and other small prey from a perch on a bush. Although similar in build to the shrikes, these tend to be either colourful species or largely black; some species are quite secretive.

 Brubru, Nilaus afer
 Northern puffback, Dryoscopus gambensis
 Black-crowned tchagra, Tchagra senegala
 Yellow-crowned gonolek, Laniarius barbarus
 Sulphur-breasted bushshrike, Telophorus sulfureopectus
 Gray-headed bushshrike, Malaconotus blanchoti

Drongos
Order: PasseriformesFamily: Dicruridae

The drongos are mostly black or dark grey in colour, sometimes with metallic tints. They have long forked tails, and some Asian species have elaborate tail decorations. They have short legs and sit very upright when perched, like a shrike. They flycatch or take prey from the ground.

Western square-tailed drongo, Dicrurus occidentalis
Glossy-backed drongo, Dicrurus divaricatus

Monarch flycatchers
Order: PasseriformesFamily: Monarchidae

The monarch flycatchers are small to medium-sized insectivorous passerines which hunt by flycatching.

 Black-headed paradise-flycatcher, Terpsiphone rufiventer
 African paradise-flycatcher, Terpsiphone viridis

Shrikes

Order: PasseriformesFamily: Laniidae

Shrikes are passerine birds known for their habit of catching other birds and small animals and impaling the uneaten portions of their bodies on thorns. A shrike's beak is hooked, like that of a typical bird of prey.

 Red-backed shrike, Lanius collurio (A)
 Red-tailed shrike, Lanius phoenicuroides
 Isabelline shrike, Lanius isabellinus(A)
 Great gray shrike, Lanius excubitor(A)
 Yellow-billed shrike, Lanius corvinus
 Woodchat shrike, Lanius senator

Crows, jays, and magpies

Order: PasseriformesFamily: Corvidae

The family Corvidae includes crows, ravens, jays, choughs, magpies, treepies, nutcrackers, and ground jays. Corvids are above average in size among the Passeriformes, and some of the larger species show high levels of intelligence.

 Piapiac, Ptilostomus afer
 Pied crow, Corvus albus
 Brown-necked raven, Corvus ruficollis(A)

Hyliotas
Order: PasseriformesFamily: Hyliotidae

The members of this small family, all of genus Hyliota, are birds of the forest canopy. They tend to feed in mixed-species flocks.

 Yellow-bellied hyliota, Hyliota flavigaster
 Southern hyliota, Hyliota australis

Fairy flycatchers
Order: PasseriformesFamily: Stenostiridae

Most of the species of this small family are found in Africa, though a few inhabit tropical Asia. They are not closely related to other birds called "flycatchers".

 African blue flycatcher, Elminia longicauda

Tits, chickadees, and titmice
Order: PasseriformesFamily: Paridae

The Paridae are mainly small stocky woodland species with short stout bills. Some have crests. They are adaptable birds, with a mixed diet including seeds and insects.

 White-shouldered black-tit, Melaniparus guineensis

Penduline-tits
Order: PasseriformesFamily: Remizidae

The penduline-tits are a group of small passerine birds related to the true tits. They are insectivores.

 Yellow penduline-tit, Anthoscopus parvulus

Larks
Order: PasseriformesFamily: Alaudidae

 Rufous-rumped lark, Pinarocorys erythropygia (A)
 Dusky lark, Pinarocorys nigricans (A)
 Chestnut-backed sparrow-lark, Eremopterix leucotis
 Black-crowned sparrow-lark, Eremopterix nigriceps (A)
 Flappet lark, Mirafra rufocinnamomea
 Kordofan lark, Mirafra cordofanica
 Horsfield’s bushlark, Mirafra javanica
 Temminck's lark, Eremophila bilopha(A)
 Sun lark, Galerida modesta
 Crested lark, Galerida cristata

Nicators
Order: PasseriformesFamily: Nicatoridae

The nicators are shrike-like, with hooked bills. They are endemic to sub-Saharan Africa.

Western nicator, Nicator chloris

African warblers
Order: PasseriformesFamily: Macrosphenidae

African warblers are small to medium-sized insectivores which are found in a wide variety of habitats south of the Sahara.

 Green crombec, Sylvietta virens
 Lemon-bellied crombec, Sylvietta denti(A)
 Northern crombec, Sylvietta brachyura
 Green hylia, Hylia prasina

Cisticolas and allies
Order: PasseriformesFamily: Cisticolidae

The Cisticolidae are warblers found mainly in warmer southern regions of the Old World. They are generally very small birds of drab brown or grey appearance found in open country such as grassland or scrub.

 Yellow-bellied eremomela,  Eremomela icteropygialis
 Senegal eremomela, Eremomela pusilla
 Green-backed eremomela, Camaroptera brachyura
 Olive-green camaroptera, Camaroptera chloronota
 Yellow-breasted apalis, Apalis flavida
 Tawny-flanked prinia, Prinia subflava
 River prinia, Prinia fluviatilis
 Oriole warbler, Hypergerus atriceps
 Red-faced cisticola, Cisticola erythrops
 Singing cisticola, Cisticola cantans
 Whistling cisticola, Cisticola lateralis
 Dorst's cisticola, Cisticola guinea
 Winding cisticola, Cisticola marginatus
 Croaking cisticola, Cisticola natalensis
 Siffling cisticola, Cisticola brachypterus
 Rufous cisticola, Cisticola rufus
 Zitting cisticola, Cisticola juncidis
 Desert cisticola, Cisticola aridulus
 Black-backed cisticola, Cisticola eximius

Reed warblers and allies

Order: PasseriformesFamily: Acrocephalidae

The members of this family are usually rather large for "warblers". Most are rather plain olivaceous brown above with much yellow to beige below. They are usually found in open woodland, reedbeds, or tall grass. The family occurs mostly in southern to western Eurasia and surroundings, but it also ranges far into the Pacific, with some species in Africa.

 Eastern olivaceous warbler, Iduna pallida
 Western olivaceous warbler, Iduna opaca
 Melodious warbler, Hippolais polyglotta
 Icterine warbler, Hippolais icterina(A)
 Moustached warbler, Acrocephalus melanopogon (A)
 Sedge warbler, Acrocephalus schoenobaenus
 Marsh warbler, Acrocephalus palustris (A)
 Common reed warbler, Acrocephalus scirpaceus
 Greater swamp warbler, Acrocephalus rufescens
 Great reed warbler, Acrocephalus arundinaceus(A)

Grassbirds and allies
Order: PasseriformesFamily: Locustellidae

Locustellidae are a family of small insectivorous songbirds found mainly in Eurasia, Africa, and the Australian region. They are smallish birds with tails that are usually long and pointed, and tend to be drab brownish or buffy all over.

 Savi's warbler, Locustella luscinioides (A)
 Common grasshopper-warbler, Locustella naevia(A)

Swallows
Order: PasseriformesFamily: Hirundinidae

The family Hirundinidae is adapted to aerial feeding. They have a slender streamlined body, long pointed wings, and a short bill with a wide gape. The feet are adapted to perching rather than walking, and the front toes are partially joined at the base.

 Plain martin, Riparia paludicola
 Bank swallow, Riparia riparia
 Banded martin, Neophedina cincta (A) 
 Eurasian crag-martin, Ptyonoprogne rupestris 
 Barn swallow, Hirundo rustica
 Red-chested swallow, Hirundo lucida
 Ethiopian swallow, Hirundo aethiopica
 Wire-tailed swallow, Hirundo smithii
 Pied-winged swallow, Hirundo leucosoma
 Red-rumped swallow, Cecropis daurica
 Lesser striped swallow, Cecropis abyssinica (A) 
 Rufous-chested swallow, Cecropis semirufa
 Mosque swallow, Cecropis senegalensis
 Common house-martin, Delichon urbicum
 Fanti sawwing, Psalidoprocne obscura
 Gray-rumped swallow, Pseudhirundo griseopyga (A)

Bulbuls
Order: PasseriformesFamily: Pycnonotidae

Bulbuls are medium-sized songbirds. Some are colourful with yellow, red or orange vents, cheeks, throats or supercilia, but most are drab, with uniform olive-brown to black plumage. Some species have distinct crests.

 Gray-headed bristlebill, Bleda canicapillus
 Sjöstedt's greenbul, Baeopogon clamans
 Yellow-throated greenbul, Atimastillas flavicollis
 Swamp greenbul, Thescelocichla leucopleura(A)
 Red-tailed greenbul, Criniger calurus
 Little greenbul, Eurillas virens
 Leaf-love, Phyllastrephus scandens
 White-throated greenbul, Phyllastrephus albigularis
 Common bulbul, Pycnonotus barbatus

Leaf warblers
Order: PasseriformesFamily: Phylloscopidae

Leaf warblers are a family of small insectivorous birds found mostly in Eurasia and ranging into Wallacea and Africa. The species are of various sizes, often green-plumaged above and yellow below, or more subdued with greyish-green to greyish-brown colours.

 Wood warbler, Phylloscopus sibilatrix(A)
 Western Bonelli's warbler, Phylloscopus bonelli
 Yellow-browed warbler, Phylloscopus inornatus(A)
 Willow warbler, Phylloscopus trochilus
 Common chiffchaff, Phylloscopus collybita
 Iberian chiffchaff, Phylloscopus ibericus (A)

Sylviid warblers, parrotbills, and allies
Order: PasseriformesFamily: Sylviidae

The family Sylviidae is a group of small insectivorous passerine birds. As another common name, Old World warblers, implies, they mainly occur as breeding species in Europe, Asia and, to a lesser extent, Africa. Most are of generally undistinguished appearance, but many have distinctive songs.

 Eurasian blackcap, Sylvia atricapilla
 Garden warbler, Sylvia borin
 Barred warbler, Curruca nisoria (A)
 Lesser whitethroat, Curruca curruca(A)
 Western Orphean warbler, Curruca hortensis (A)
 Rüppell's warbler, Curruca ruppeli(A)
 Western subalpine warbler, Curruca iberiae
 Eastern subalpine warbler, Curruca cantillans
 Greater whitethroat, Curruca communis
 Spectacled warbler, Curruca conspicillata(A)

White-eyes, yuhinas, and allies
Order: PasseriformesFamily: Zosteropidae

The white-eyes are small and mostly undistinguished, their plumage above being generally some dull colour like greenish-olive, but some species have a white or bright yellow throat, breast, or lower parts, and several have buff flanks. As their name suggests, many species have a white ring around each eye.

 Northern yellow white-eye, Zosterops senegalensis

Ground babblers and allies
Order: PasseriformesFamily: Pellorneidae

These small to medium-sized songbirds have soft fluffy plumage but are otherwise rather diverse. Members of the genus Illadopsis are found in forests, but some other genera are birds of scrublands.

 Brown illadopsis, Illadopsis fulvescens (A)
 Puvel's illadopsis, Illadopsis puveli

Laughingthrushes and allies
Order: PasseriformesFamily: Leiothrichidae

The members of this family are diverse in size and colouration, though those of genus Turdoides tend to be brown or greyish. The family is found in Africa, India, and southeast Asia.

 Capuchin babbler, Turdoides atripennis'
 Blackcap babbler, Turdoides reinwardtii Brown babbler, Turdoides plebejusTreecreepers
Order: PasseriformesFamily: Certhiidae

Treecreepers are small woodland birds, brown above and white below. They have thin pointed down-curved bills, which they use to extricate insects from bark. They have stiff tail feathers, like woodpeckers, which they use to support themselves on vertical trees.

 African spotted creeper, Salpornis salvadoriOxpeckers
Order: PasseriformesFamily: Buphagidae

As both the English and scientific names of these birds imply, they feed on ectoparasites, primarily ticks, found on large mammals.

Yellow-billed oxpecker, Buphagus africanusStarlings

Order: PasseriformesFamily: Sturnidae

Starlings are small to medium-sized passerine birds. Their flight is strong and direct and they are very gregarious. Their preferred habitat is fairly open country. They eat insects and fruit. Plumage is typically dark with a metallic sheen.

 Wattled starling, Creatophora cinerea(A)
 Violet-backed starling, Cinnyricinclus leucogaster Neumann's starling, Onychognathus neumanni Long-tailed glossy starling, Lamprotornis caudatus Splendid starling, Lamprotornis splendidus Chestnut-bellied starling, Lamprotornis pulcher Lesser blue-eared starling, Lamprotornis chloropterus Greater blue-eared starling, Lamprotornis chalybaeus Purple starling, Lamprotornis purpureus Bronze-tailed starling, Lamprotornis chalcurusThrushes and allies
Order: PasseriformesFamily: Turdidae

The thrushes are a group of passerine birds that occur mainly in the Old World. They are plump, soft plumaged, small to medium-sized insectivores or sometimes omnivores, often feeding on the ground. Many have attractive songs.

 African thrush, Turdus peliosOld World flycatchers
Order: PasseriformesFamily: Muscicapidae

Old World flycatchers are a large group of small passerine birds native to the Old World. They are mainly small arboreal insectivores. The appearance of these birds is highly varied, but they mostly have weak songs and harsh calls.

 Spotted flycatcher, Muscicapa striata Swamp flycatcher, Muscicapa aquatica'
 Pale flycatcher, Agricola pallidus
 Gray tit-flycatcher, Fraseria plumbea
 Northern black-flycatcher, Melaenornis edolioides White-tailed alethe, Alethe diademata
 Black scrub-robin, Cercotrichas podobe
 Rufous-tailed scrub-robin, Cercotrichas galactotes (A)
 Snowy-crowned robin-chat, Cossypha niveicapilla
 White-crowned robin-chat, Cossypha albicapilla
 Common nightingale, Luscinia megarhynchos
 Bluethroat, Luscinia svecica (A)
 European pied flycatcher, Ficedula hypoleuca
 Common redstart, Phoenicurus phoenicurus
 Rufous-tailed rock-thrush, Monticola saxatilis
 Blue rock-thrush, Monticola solitarius
 Whinchat, Saxicola rubetra
 African stonechat, Saxicola torquatus (A)
 Northern anteater-chat, Myrmecocichla aethiops
 Northern wheatear, Oenanthe oenanthe
 Isabelline wheatear, Oenanthe isabellina(A)
 Western black-eared wheatear, Oenanthe hispanica(A)
 White-fronted black-chat, Oenanthe albifrons
 Blackstart, Oenanthe melanura(A)
 White-crowned wheatear, Oenanthe leucopyga (A)

Sunbirds and spiderhuntersOrder: PasseriformesFamily: Nectariniidae

The sunbirds and spiderhunters are very small passerine birds which feed largely on nectar, although they will also take insects, especially when feeding young. Flight is fast and direct on their short wings. Most species can take nectar by hovering like a hummingbird, but usually perch to feed.

 Mouse-brown sunbird, Anthreptes gabonicus
 Western violet-backed sunbird, Anthreptes longuemarei
 Collared sunbird, Hedydipna collaris
 Pygmy sunbird, Hedydipna platura
 Green-headed sunbird, Cyanomitra verticalis
 Scarlet-chested sunbird, Chalcomitra senegalensis
 Olive-bellied sunbird, Cinnyris chloropygia
 Beautiful sunbird, Cinnyris pulchellus
 Splendid sunbird, Cinnyris coccinigaster
 Variable sunbird, Cinnyris venustus
 Copper sunbird, Cinnyris cupreus

Weavers and alliesOrder: PasseriformesFamily: Ploceidae

The weavers are small passerine birds related to the finches. They are seed-eating birds with rounded conical bills. The males of many species are brightly coloured, usually in red or yellow and black. Some species show variation in colour only in the breeding season.

 White-billed buffalo-weaver, Bubalornis albirostris
 Speckle-fronted weaver, Sporopipes frontalis
 Chestnut-crowned sparrow-weaver, Plocepasser superciliosus
 Red-headed weaver, Anaplectes rubriceps (A)
 Little weaver, Ploceus luteolus
 Olive-naped weaver, Ploceus brachypterus
 Vitelline masked weaver, Ploceus velatus
 Heuglin's masked weaver, Ploceus heuglini
 Chestnut-and-black weaver, Ploceus castaneofuscus
 Village weaver, Ploceus cucullatus
 Black-headed weaver, Ploceus melanocephalus
 Red-headed quelea, Quelea erythrops
 Red-billed quelea, Quelea quelea
 Northern red bishop, Euplectes franciscanus
 Southern red bishop, Euplectes orix
 Black-winged bishop, Euplectes hordeaceus
 Yellow-crowned bishop, Euplectes afer
 Yellow-mantled widowbird, Euplectes macroura
 Red-collared widowbird, Euplectes ardens (A)

Waxbills and alliesOrder: PasseriformesFamily: Estrildidae

The estrildid finches are small passerine birds of the Old World tropics and Australasia. They are gregarious and often colonial seed eaters with short thick but pointed bills. They are all similar in structure and habits, but have wide variation in plumage colours and patterns.

 Bronze mannikin, Spermestes cucullata
 Magpie mannikin, Spermestes fringilloides
 African silverbill, Euodice cantans
 Indian silverbill, Euodice malabarica (I)
 Chestnut-breasted nigrita, Nigrita bicolor(A)
 Gray-headed oliveback, Delacourella capistrata(A)
 Lavender waxbill, Glaucestrilda caerulescens 
 Orange-cheeked waxbill, Estrilda melpoda
 Black-rumped waxbill, Estrilda troglodytes
 Quailfinch, Ortygospiza atricollis
 Cut-throat, Amadina fasciata
 Zebra waxbill, Amandava subflava
 Red-cheeked cordonbleu, Uraeginthus bengalus
 Western bluebill, Spermophaga haematina
 Crimson seedcracker, Pyrenestes sanguineus
 Black-bellied seedcracker, Pyrenestes ostrinus (A)
 Green-winged pytilia, Pytilia melba (A)
 Red-winged pytilia, Pytilia phoenicoptera
 Dybowski's twinspot, Euschistospiza dybowskii
 Red-billed firefinch, Lagonosticta senegala
 Bar-breasted firefinch, Lagonosticta rufopicta
 Black-faced firefinch, Lagonosticta larvata

IndigobirdsOrder: PasseriformesFamily: Viduidae

The indigobirds are finch-like species which usually have black or indigo predominating in their plumage. All are brood parasites which lay their eggs in the nests of waxbills and other estrildid finches.

 Pin-tailed whydah, Vidua macroura
 Sahel paradise-whydah, Vidua orientalis
 Exclamatory paradise-whydah, Vidua interjecta
 Village indigobird, Vidua chalybeata
 Wilson's indigobird, Vidua wilsoni (A)
 Quailfinch indigobird, Vidua nigeriae
 Baka indigobird, Vidua larvaticola
 Cameroon indigobird, Vidua camerunensis
 Parasitic weaver, Anomalospiza imberbis (A)

Old World sparrowsOrder: PasseriformesFamily: Passeridae

Sparrows are small passerine birds. In general, sparrows tend to be small, plump, brown or grey birds with short tails and short powerful beaks. Sparrows are seed eaters, but they also consume small insects.

 House sparrow, Passer domesticus(I)
 Northern gray-headed sparrow, Passer griseus
 Sudan golden sparrow, Passer luteus
 Sahel bush sparrow, Gymnoris dentata

Wagtails and pipitsOrder: PasseriformesFamily: Motacillidae

Motacillidae is a family of small passerine birds with medium to long tails. They include the wagtails, longclaws, and pipits. They are slender ground-feeding insectivores of open country.

 Western yellow wagtail, Motacilla flava
 African pied wagtail, Motacilla aguimp(A)
 White wagtail, Motacilla alba
 Tawny pipit, Anthus campestris
 Plain-backed pipit, Anthus leucophrys
 Tree pipit, Anthus trivialis
 Red-throated pipit, Anthus cervinus
 Yellow-throated longclaw, Macronyx croceus

Finches, euphonias, and alliesOrder: PasseriformesFamily: Fringillidae

Finches are seed-eating passerine birds, that are small to moderately large and have a strong beak, usually conical and in some species very large. All have twelve tail feathers and nine primaries. These birds have a bouncing flight with alternating bouts of flapping and gliding on closed wings, and most sing well.

 White-rumped seedeater, Crithagra leucopygius
 Yellow-fronted canary, Crithagra mozambicus

Old World buntingsOrder: PasseriformesFamily''': Emberizidae

The emberizids are a large family of passerine birds. They are seed-eating birds with distinctively shaped bills. Many emberizid species have distinctive head patterns.

 Brown-rumped bunting, Emberiza affinis Ortolan bunting, Emberiza hortulana(A)
 Golden-breasted bunting, Emberiza flaviventris (A)
 Gosling's bunting, Emberiza goslingi House bunting, Emberiza sahari(A)
 Striolated bunting, Emberiza striolata'' (A)

See also
 List of regional bird lists

References

External links
 African Bird Club's checklist for the Gambia
 Birds of The Gambia - World Institute for Conservation and Environment
 Avibase checklist for the Gambia

Gambia
Gambia
Birds
Gambia